Procecidochares kristineae is a species of tephritid or fruit flies in the genus Procecidochares of the family Tephritidae.

Distribution
United States.

References

Tephritinae
Insects described in 1997
Diptera of North America
Procecidochares